Fernand Picot (10 May 1930 – 22 October 2017) was a French professional racing cyclist. He rode in eight editions of the Tour de France.

Major results

1951
 2nd Boucles de l'Aulne
 5th Overall Tour de l'Ouest
1953
 1st Stages 5 & 6 Route de France
1954
 1st Boucles de l'Aulne
 1st Stage 11 Peace Race
1955
 1st Overall 
1st Stages 2 & 4
 2nd Overall Tour de l'Ouest
 2nd Paris–Camembert
 2nd Paris–Bourges
 3rd 
 3rd 
1956
 3rd Overall Critérium du Dauphiné Libéré
1st Stage 3
1957
 1st Stages 3b & 9 Critérium du Dauphiné Libéré
 7th GP Stan Ockers
1958
 1st Stage 6 Paris–Nice
 2nd Grand Prix de Saint-Raphaël
 3rd Grand Prix de Plouay
1959
 1st Stage 2 Grand Prix du Midi Libre
 2nd Critérium National de la Route
 5th GP Stan Ockers
1960
 3rd 
1961
 1st  Points classification, Critérium du Dauphiné Libéré
 1st Overall Mi-Août en Bretagne
 1st Grand Prix de Plouay
 1st Genoa–Nice
 1st Circuit de l'Aulne
 6th Critérium National de la Route
1963
 1st Circuit de l'Aulne

References

External links
 

1930 births
2017 deaths
French male cyclists
People from Pontivy
Sportspeople from Morbihan
Cyclists from Brittany